Carl Fredrik Hagen (born 26 September 1991) is a Norwegian cyclist, who currently rides for UCI ProTeam .

Career
Hagen was born in Oppegård. In August 2019, he was named in the startlist for the Vuelta a España. At the age of 27 this was his first entrance into a Grand Tour, and he rode exceedingly well. While he was not able to answer every attack made by the elite general classification riders, he did answer the majority of them and as a result he surpassed all expectations earning a top 10 finish coming in almost three minutes behind Wilco Kelderman who finished seventh, and nearly ten minutes ahead of Marc Soler who finished 9th.

In August 2020, it was announced that Hagen was to join  from the 2021 season, on a two-year contract. In October 2020, he was named in the startlist for the 2020 Giro d'Italia.

Major results

2015
 4th Overall East Bohemia Tour
2016
 1st  Mountains classification, Tour des Fjords
 1st  Mountains classification, Tour de Bretagne
 1st  Mountains classification, East Bohemia Tour
 2nd Sundvolden GP
2017
 1st  Mountains classification, Ronde de l'Oise
 2nd Sundvolden GP
 2nd Ringerike GP
 2nd Overall Tour Alsace
1st Stage 4
 8th Overall Arctic Race of Norway
2018
 1st  Overall Tour du Jura
 2nd Sundvolden GP
 4th Overall Tour of Norway
 6th Ringerike GP
 8th Overall Arctic Race of Norway
 9th Tour du Finistère
2019
 3rd Road race, National Road Championships
 7th Overall Tour of Guangxi
 8th Overall Vuelta a España
 10th Overall Tour of Norway
2020
 3rd Road race, National Road Championships
2021
 10th Overall CRO Race
2022
 5th Overall Tour de Hongrie
 5th Road race, National Road Championships
 9th Overall Arctic Race of Norway
 10th Overall Tour of Norway

Grand Tour general classification results timeline

References

External links

1991 births
Living people
Norwegian male cyclists
People from Oppegård
Sportspeople from Viken (county)